Kristoffer Madsen (born 6 June 1996) is a Norwegian racing cyclist. He competed in the men's team time trial event at the 2017 UCI Road World Championships.

References

External links

1996 births
Living people
Norwegian male cyclists
Place of birth missing (living people)